A heater is an appliance whose purpose is to generate heat for a building.

Heater or Heaters may also refer to:

Science, technology and engineering
 Central heating, a system used to heat an entire building

Devices
 Aquarium heater, in fishkeeping, used to warm aquarium water
 Boiler or heater, used to heat water for use in a heating system
 Furnace or heater, used to heat buildings using a central system
 Radiator (heating) or heater, used to transmit heat from a boiler
 Space heater, that heats a single area
 Gas heater, that heats a area using gas
 Oil heater, that heats oil to heat a room

Physics
 Heating element, a device that converts electricity into heat
 Cathode heater, in vacuum tubes and gas-filled tubes
 Heater, a vacuum tube filament for an indirectly heated cathode in a vacuum tube

Music
 Heaters (band), an American rock band
 "The Heater", a song by The Mutton Birds
 "Heater" (Samim song), a song by Samim
 "Heaters", a song on the IllScarlett album Clearly in Another Fine Mess

Other uses
 Heater, a slang term for a firearm, usually a handgun or revolver
 Heater (surname)
 Heater shield, a type of shield
 Heaters, West Virginia, an unincorporated community in the US